Hyperolius molleri is a species of frog in the family Hyperoliidae. It is endemic to São Tomé Island. Records from Príncipe now refer to Hyperolius drewesi, described as a distinct species in 2016.

Taxonomy and systematics
The species was described by Jacques von Bedriaga in 1892 and was named after Adolphe F. Moller (1842–1920), a Portuguese botanist who collected in São Tomé. It belongs to the so-called Hyperolius cinnamomeoventris species complex. It can form hybrids with Hyperolius thomensis.

Description
Adult males measure  and adult females  in snout–vent length. The dorsum is bright green or brown and hasfine spinosities. Juveniles have light dorsolateral lines. The ventrum is uniform white or red. The ventral sides of the legs are white to red. The pupil is horizontal.

Habitat and conservation
The eggs are laid on leaf surfaces over still or very slow-moving water. The tadpoles develop in the water.

Hyperolius molleri is common. It is not known to face significant threats, given its adaptability to habitat modification. It occurs in the Parque Natural Obô de São Tomé.

References

molleri
Frogs of Africa
Endemic vertebrates of São Tomé and Príncipe
Amphibians described in 1892
Taxa named by Jacques von Bedriaga
Taxonomy articles created by Polbot